John Crabbe Cunningham (1927 – 31 January 1980) was a Scottish climber.  Born in Glasgow, he climbed extensively in the Scottish mountains, where he pioneered new techniques of ice climbing.

For several years, he worked for the British Antarctic Survey (BAS) of the British Antarctic Territory (BAT). On 23 November 1964, he became the first to climb Antarctica's Mount Jackson. In 1960–61, he was a member of the Falkland Islands Dependencies Survey, serving as Station Commander at Stonington Island in 1962–63. He was a member of the British Antarctic Survey, and was Station Commander of Adelaide Island in 1964–65. He was also a member of the South Georgia Survey of 1955–56. He died in 1980.

Professional years
During the 1950s and '60s, Cunningham went to New Zealand, India and Antarctica. He wanted to climb to Mount Everest, and in 1953 he had gone to Nepal via India with Hamish MacInnes, also a Scottish mountaineer, to start his climb. However, Hillary and Tenzing had made it to the top of Mount Everest before he could begin.

He then started his career with the British Antarctic Survey. He was the base leader at Adelaide Island. In the 1970s, after he returned to Scotland, he became an instructor at the Glenmore Lodge near Aviemore. In this capacity he perfected innovations in techniques for front point cramponing and use of curved pick ice axes on steep sloping ice. He had used this front point technique while working in Antarctica on icebergs and cliffs with a slope of 70 to 90 degrees. In 1976 he became an instructor at I M Marsh Campus in Liverpool. In 1980, he took his students for practical instruction on climbing to the South Stack sea-cliffs on Anglesey. He drowned at South Stack on 31 January 1980, while attempting to rescue a female pupil who fell into the sea while Coasteering. The student survived.

Honours
Cunningham is the namesake of Mount Cunningham in the Queen Maud Bay at the southern end of South Georgia, His biography, titled Creagh Dhu Climber, the life and times of John Cunningham, was published by Ernest Press.

References

1927 births
1980 deaths
Scottish explorers
Explorers of Antarctica
Scottish mountain climbers
Sportspeople from Glasgow
Deaths by drowning in the United Kingdom
Accidental deaths in Scotland